Đorđe Lazić may refer to:

 Đorđe Lazić (footballer) (born 1983), Serbian footballer 
 Đorđe Lazić (water polo) (born 1996), Serbian water polo player